Marcantonio Colonna (P434) is the fifth ship of Paolo Thaon di Revel-class offshore patrol vessel built for the Italian Navy.  
 
It was laid down on 3 September 2020 at Fincantieri Muggiano and expected to be launched in 2023. Expected to be commissioned in April 2024.

External links
 Pattugliatori Polivalenti di Altura Marina Militare website

Ships built by Fincantieri